Phthisis  ('wasting away'; Roman name), one of the Nosoi/Pestis, was the personification/daemon of rot, decay and putrefaction, in Classical/Greco-Roman mythology.

References

Greek goddesses
Personifications in Greek mythology
Roman deities
Personifications in Roman mythology
Daimons